Byron Janis (born March 24, 1928) is an American classical pianist. He made several recordings for RCA Victor and Mercury Records, and occupies two volumes of the Philips series Great Pianists of the 20th Century. His discography covers repertoire from Bach to David W. Guion and includes major piano concertos from Mozart to Rachmaninoff and Liszt to Prokofiev.

Biography
Janis studied with Abraham Litow until he was 8 years old. Vladimir Horowitz heard Janis play  Rachmaninoff's Concerto No. 2 in Pittsburg, and immediately took him as his first pupil. Janis studied with Horowitz from 1944 until 1948.

Janis was also a composer. He wrote music for musical theater, including the score for a 1993 Off-Broadway adaptation of The Hunchback of Notre-Dame, for television shows, and in collaboration on several pieces with Cy Coleman

In 1967, Janis accidentally unearthed what The New York Times called "That rarest of all musical items...", two previously unknown manuscripts of published Chopin waltzes (Op. 18 and Op. 70, No. 1) at the Chateau de Thoiry in France. Several years later, Janis found the same two waltzes in different versions at Yale University. These manuscripts are published together under one cover in Frédéric Chopin, ed. Byron Janis, The Most Dramatic Musical Discovery of the Age, Envolve Books, 1978.

In 1973, Janis developed severe arthritis in both hands and wrists. In 1985, he talked about his difficulties in public for the first time and became the First Ambassador for the Arthritis Foundation. In June 2012, he was presented with a Lifetime Achievement Award for his work in Arthritis Advocacy.

Janis and his wife, Maria Cooper, daughter of screen  actor Gary Cooper, wrote his autobiography Chopin and Beyond: My Extraordinary Life in Music and the Paranormal, which was released in November 2010. In the DVD A Voyage With Byron Janis, he hosts a musical journey through Chopin's life. Martin Scorsese is developing a Byron Janis Biopic for Paramount Pictures from a script by Peter Glanz. The project is based on Janis' autobiography.

Honors
Janis has received several awards and honors including: 
 Commander of the French Légion d'Honneur for Arts and Letters
 Grand Prix du Disque
 Stanford Fellowship, the highest honor of Yale University 
 Distinguished Pennsylvania Artist Award

He received an honorary doctorate at Trinity College and the gold medal from the French Society for the Encouragement of Progress, the first musician to receive this honor since its inception in 1906. He has been invited six times by four sitting Presidents to perform at the White House and was written into the Congressional Record of both the Senate and the House of Representatives, honoring him as, “a musician, a diplomat and an inspiration.” He was featured in the PBS documentary, by Emmy-award-winning producer Peter Rosen, The Byron Janis Story, which highlights his struggles with arthritis.

References

John Ardoin, Great Pianists of the 20th Century, Philips, 1999, Set I on Byron Janis
Chesnut, Daniel Lawrence. "One Of My Favorite Artists Vladimir Samoylovych Horowitz". Artists Are The Breath Of Creation
ABC News, “Byron Janis: World Renown [sic] Pianist Despite Pain”, Mikaela Conley, April 5, 2011

External links
Official website
IMDb profile
 

1928 births
Living people
American people of Polish-Jewish descent
American people of Russian-Jewish descent
Jewish American classical musicians
American classical pianists
Male classical pianists
American male pianists
Musicians from Pittsburgh
People from McKeesport, Pennsylvania
Child classical musicians
Commandeurs of the Légion d'honneur
Commandeurs of the Ordre des Arts et des Lettres
Jewish classical pianists
20th-century American pianists
Classical musicians from Pennsylvania
21st-century classical pianists
20th-century American male musicians
21st-century American male musicians
21st-century American pianists
21st-century American Jews